Anderson Nunataks, also known as Shimizu Nunatak, is a group of nunataks forming the northeast end of the Sweeney Mountains, Antarctica. They were discovered and photographed from the air by the Ronne Antarctic Research Expedition, 1947–48, and mapped by the United States Geological Survey from surveys and from U.S. Navy air photos, 1961–67. Named by the Advisory Committee on Antarctic Names for Richard E. Anderson, aviation electronics technician on R4D flights in 1961, including a November 4 reconnaissance flight from Byrd Station to the Eights Coast.

External links
US Geological Survey Official Site

References
 

Nunataks of Palmer Land